Henry M. Peters (November 21, 1889 – May 4, 1987) was a member of the Wisconsin State Assembly.

Biography
Peters was born Henry Martin Peters on November 21, 1889 in Woodville, Calumet County, Wisconsin. He became a dairy farmer.

Political career
Peters served in the Assembly from 1949 to 1958 as a Republican. He was defeated for re-election in 1958, running as an Independent.

References

People from Calumet County, Wisconsin
Members of the Wisconsin State Assembly
Wisconsin Independents
Wisconsin Republicans
1889 births
1987 deaths
20th-century American politicians